Pisgah State Park is a  public recreation area located in the Cheshire County towns of Winchester, Chesterfield and Hinsdale in New Hampshire. It is the largest state park in New Hampshire and contains a complete watershed north of the Ashuelot River, seven ponds, four highland ridges, numerous wetlands, and a  parcel of old-growth forest.

Geography
The park occupies portions of three towns in southwestern New Hampshire:  are in Winchester, the northern  are in Chesterfield, and the westernmost  are in Hinsdale. The largest water body is the  Pisgah Reservoir/Round Pond, west of the center of the park. The  Kilburn Pond is near the western border.

Recreational use
Pisgah State Park is open year round for hiking. Mountain biking, ATV and snowmobile use is permitted on certain trails. There are six trailheads around the park that provide free access to the public.

References

External links 
Pisgah State Park New Hampshire Department of Natural and Cultural Resources
Pisgah State Park Trail Map New Hampshire Department of Natural and Cultural Resources

State parks of New Hampshire
State parks of the Appalachians
Parks in Cheshire County, New Hampshire
Winchester, New Hampshire
Chesterfield, New Hampshire
Hinsdale, New Hampshire
Protected areas established in 1967
1967 establishments in New Hampshire
Old-growth forests